Georgi Dzhustanovich Gurtskaya (born 30 January 1986) is a former Russian professional footballer.

Club career
He made his debut in the Russian Premier League in 2004 for FC Dynamo Moscow.

See also
Football in Russia

References

1986 births
Living people
Russian footballers
Association football forwards
FC Dynamo Moscow players
Russian Premier League players
FC Dynamo Saint Petersburg players
FC Mostransgaz Gazoprovod players
FC MVD Rossii Moscow players